Out of Bounds is a comedy thriller play by the British writer Arthur Watkyn. It enjoyed a successful run at Wyndham's Theatre in the West End with Michael Redgrave in the lead role of Lancelot Dodd, a naive headmaster who is an exact Doppelgänger of a British spy who has recently died. The West End cast also included Pauline Jameson, Anton Diffring, Graham Armitage, Peter Stephens, Michael Balfour, Michael Bates, Lionel Gamlin and Charles Heslop. It was directed by Harold French.

Film adaptation
In 1964 it was made into a West German film A Mission for Mr. Dodd directed by Günter Gräwert and Heinz Rühmann and Maria Sebaldt. Anton Diffring who had appeared in the West End play, was also in the film cast.

References

Bibliography
 Lachman, Marvin. The Villainous Stage: Crime Plays on Broadway and in the West End. McFarland, 2014.

1962 plays
British plays
West End plays
Comedy plays
Plays set in London
British plays adapted into films
Plays by Arthur Watkyn